Chirvat-türkisi or Croatian song is a love song from a manuscript from , written in Arebica by a certain Mehmed in Transylvania. It also contains a number of German, Hungarian and Latin songs written in the Arabic script. This manuscript is held in the National Library in Vienna.

References

 

1588 works
Bosnia and Herzegovina literature
Croatian poems